Robert Hayden (1913–1980) was an American poet, essayist, and educator.

Robert Hayden may also refer to:

 Bob Hayden, American ice hockey referee
 Robert Haydn, a fictional character in The Law of Ueki